David Adams Curtis (born June 22, 1946 in Marblehead, Massachusetts) is an American sailor and sail maker.

As a sailor he competed at the highest level in many National and International classes. He won the World Championships in the Etchells severn times and was second six time. However Dave was successful in many other classes he with five North American, four US, one European and one World Championship in the Soling, and one in the J/24 he won the Worlds once and four North American Championships. As sail maker he held franchises for, among others, Horizon Sails, North Sails and Doyle Sails.

Curtis was inducted into the National Sailing Hall of Fame in 2013.

References

1946 births
Living people
American male sailors (sport)
World champions in sailing for the United States
J/24 class world champions
Etchells class world champions
Soling class world champions
European Champions Soling
North American Champions Soling
People from Marblehead, Massachusetts
Sailmakers
Sportspeople from Essex County, Massachusetts
Tufts University alumni
Tufts Jumbos sailors